Akademicheskaya is a station of the Saint Petersburg Metro. It is part of the Kirovsko-Vyborgskaya line, located between the stations " Polytechnicheskaya" and " Grazhdansky prospect".

It opened on 31 December 1975. The station is about  under the ground.

The station's name was determined by the fact that there are a number of research institutes nearby, so a number of streets in this area were named according to the broad principle - glorify science and its figures.

From July 30, 2018, to July 1, 2019, the station was closed for overhaul.

Surface facilities 
The entrance lobby of the station is located on the corner of Civil Avenue (Rus:Гражданский проспект) and Avenue of Science (Rus:Проспект Науки) .
The frieze inside the ground lobby is made of polished red-pink granite, the floor is made of gray granite, the walls of the cash room are faced with white marble.

Underground structure 
"Academic" station has a deep column foundation (depth ≈ 64 m). The theme of the underground hall is devoted to Soviet science. On the wall at the end of the hall is an inscription with the words of Lenin:

Now all the wonders of technology and the conquest of culture will become public property, and from now on may the human mind and genius never be turned into a means of violence

()

The columns and arches of the platform hall are finished with stamped profiles of polished stainless steel, which is a bit like the station "Mayakovskaya" in Moscow. The track walls are faced with white marble, the floors - with gray granite. The doors on the track walls are closed with small stainless steel squares (3 × 5). According to the project, to illuminate the station above the columns, original lamps were installed in the form of double-folded daylight tubes that did not have lampshades, and existed until 2004. As a result of the lighting replacement, these fixtures were removed and replaced with conventional standard  fluorescent lamps in metal "office" shades. The result of the work was that the station became lighter, but at the same time it lost its original appearance. Since December 2015, the lighting has been replaced again, this time with a back-cornice.

An inclined passage (station exit), containing four escalators, is located at the northern end of the station; in 2016, the tilting luminaires were changed from “light bollards” to “torches”.

In the lower hall of the escalator slope, lamps of the original design are used, which after a major overhaul in 2018–2019. were replaced by conventional standard ones.

References 

Saint Petersburg Metro stations
Railway stations in Russia opened in 1975
Railway stations located underground in Russia